In enzymology, a phosphoribokinase is an enzyme that catalyzes the chemical reaction

ATP + D-ribose 5-phosphate  ADP + D-ribose 1,5-bisphosphate

Thus, the two substrates of this enzyme are ATP and D-ribose 5-phosphate, whereas its two products are ADP and D-ribose 1,5-bisphosphate.

This enzyme belongs to the family of transferases, specifically those transferring phosphorus-containing groups (phosphotransferases) with an alcohol group as acceptor.  The systematic name of this enzyme class is ATP:D-ribose-5-phosphate 1-phosphotransferase. This enzyme is also called phosphoribokinase (phosphorylating).

References 

 
 

EC 2.7.1
Enzymes of unknown structure